The St. Andrews North Point Lighthouse is an active lighthouse in St. Andrews, New Brunswick on the southern tip of the peninsula in the Passamaquoddy Bay; it is commonly known as Pendlebury Lighthouse from the name of the family who took care of it.

History
The first lighthouse was built in 1833 and consisted of a white wooden octagonal pyramidal tower with balcony and red lantern. In 1840 the foundation were secured and the lantern was changed because it was deemed to be unfit. In 1842 John Pendlebury was transferred from Machias Seal Island to become the second keeper of the lighthouse, beginning a family dynasty of keepers until 1938 when the light was decommissioned.

The old lighthouse is managed by St. Andrews Civic Trust Inc.

Keepers
 James Smith (1833 – 1842)
 John Pendlebury (1842 – 1855)
 George A. Pendlebury (1855 – 1889)
 William J. Pendlebury (1889 – 1916)
 Mary A. Pendlebury (1916)
 Emma Pendlebury (1917 – 1938)

See also
 List of lighthouses in New Brunswick
 List of lighthouses in Canada

References

External links
 Canada's Historic Places by Parks Canada
 Canadian Coast Guard

Lighthouses in New Brunswick
Lighthouses completed in 1833
Saint Andrews, New Brunswick
1830s establishments in New Brunswick